Holuba Zatoka (from greek Limèn, Λιμήν, "port") is an urban-type settlement in the Yalta Municipality of the Autonomous Republic of Crimea, a territory recognized by a majority of countries as part of Ukraine and annexed by Russia as the Republic of Crimea.

The settlement was first mentioned in written documents in 1864 when it was called Limena. It was known by that name until 1945 when it was changed to its current name. In 1971, the settlement received the status of an urban-type settlement.

Its population was 363 in the 2001 Ukrainian census. Current population:

References

External links
 http://rada.gov.ua/

Urban-type settlements in Crimea
Seaside resorts in Russia
Seaside resorts in Ukraine
Yalta Municipality